The canton of Gap-Nord-Ouest is a former administrative division in southeastern France. It was disbanded following the French canton reorganisation which came into effect in March 2015. It had 3,824 inhabitants (2012). The canton comprised part of the commune of Gap.

Demographics

See also
Cantons of the Hautes-Alpes department

References

Former cantons of Hautes-Alpes
2015 disestablishments in France
States and territories disestablished in 2015